Zsuzsanna "Zsuzsa" Kézi (née Pethő, 14 May 1945 – 18 May 2021) was a Hungarian handball player, Olympic Games and World Championship bronze medalist. She was born in Bakonybánk. She won the bronze medal on the 1975 World Championship in the Soviet Union, and added another bronze to her collection on the 1976 Summer Olympics.

References

External links

1945 births
2021 deaths
Hungarian female handball players
Handball players at the 1976 Summer Olympics
Olympic bronze medalists for Hungary
Olympic handball players of Hungary
Olympic medalists in handball
Medalists at the 1976 Summer Olympics
Sportspeople from Komárom-Esztergom County